Arno Van De Velde (born 30 December 1995) is a Belgian professional volleyball player. He is a member of the Belgium national team. At the professional club level, he plays for Volley Menen.

Honours

Clubs
 National championships
 2012/2013  Belgian Cup, with Knack Roeselare
 2012/2013  Belgian Championship, with Knack Roeselare
 2013/2014  Belgian SuperCup, with Knack Roeselare
 2013/2014  Belgian Championship, with Knack Roeselare
 2014/2015  Belgian SuperCup, with Knack Roeselare
 2014/2015  Belgian Championship, with Knack Roeselare
 2015/2016  Belgian Cup, with Knack Roeselare
 2015/2016  Belgian Championship, with Knack Roeselare
 2016/2017  Belgian Cup, with Knack Roeselare
 2016/2017  Belgian Championship, with Knack Roeselare
 2017/2018  Belgian Cup, with Knack Roeselare
 2018/2019  Belgian SuperCup, with Knack Roeselare
 2018/2019  Belgian Cup, with Knack Roeselare
 2021/2022  Belgian Championship, with Knack Roeselare

References

External links
 
 Player profile at Volleybox.net

1995 births
Living people
Sportspeople from Aalst, Belgium
Belgian men's volleyball players
European Games competitors for Belgium
Volleyball players at the 2015 European Games
Belgian expatriate sportspeople in France
Expatriate volleyball players in France
Belgian expatriate sportspeople in Germany
Expatriate volleyball players in Germany
Middle blockers